is a Japanese architect and writer. He has lived for more than ten years in Zambia, researching Spanish architecture, especially the architecture of Gaudi, on which he has published several studies.

Bibliography
El munco enigmático de Gaudí, Madrid; Instituto de España, 1983, 2 vols. 
Antonio Gaudí  (The life of Gaudí), Tokyo; Kajimashuppankai, 1985 
The architecture of Gaudí ("Gaudí no kenchiku"), Tokyo; Kajimashuppankai, 1987 
The Philosophy of Gaudí ("Gaudí no Nanatsu no Shuchoo"), Tokyo; Kajimashuppankai, 1990 
The origins of Gaudí's architecture, Tokyo; Kajimashuppankai, 2001 
Gaudí, his architecture and his historical world, Tokyo; Chuokoronbijutsu-Shuppan, 2000　
Gaudí, his complete writings and words, Tokyo; Chuokoronbijutsu-Shuppan, 2007

Works
Jizo Tower of Hatagaya, Tokyo 1971–73
Reconstruction of Gaudi's project of the Catholic Missions for Africa in Tangiers (1892–93) 1981–82
Casa de España (project), Tokyo 1984
Asahiya Hotel, Tsukuba, Ibaraki, 1986–87 (Mugito Architects)
Sinkong Life Insurance Group Headquarters (project), Taipei 1986–87 (KMG *Architects & Engineers)
Association of East Asian Relations, Tokyo, 1987–89 (KMG Architects & Engineers)
Club House, Uchihara Country Club, Uchihara, Ibaraki 1989–90 (KMG Architects & Engineers)
Takatsu Hotel, Tsukuba, Ibaraki, 1989–90 (Mugito Architects)
Club House, Higashi-Chiba Country Club, Togane, Chiba, 1990–93 (KMG Architects & Engineers)
Club House, Tong Hwa Country Club, Taipei 1990–93 (KMG Architects & Engineers)
Club House, Kozaki Country Club, Kozaki, Chiba, 1992–93 (KMG Architects & Engineers)
Taiwan Cement Building, Taipei 1991–97 (KMG Architects & Engineers)
Cathay Financial Center, Taipei 1995–97 (KMG Architects & Engineers)

References 

1947 births
Japanese architects
Japanese non-fiction writers
Living people